The 2022 Nevada Secretary of State election was held on November 8, 2022, to elect the next secretary of state of Nevada.

Incumbent Republican Barbara Cegavske was term-limited and could not seek a third term.

Republican primary

Candidates

Nominee

Eliminated in primary
Kristopher Dahir, Sparks city councilman
John Gerhardt
Jesse Haw, former state senator (2016)
Socorro Keenan
Gerard Ramalho, former news anchor
Richard Scotti, former 8th Nevada judicial court judge

Endorsements

Polling

Results

Democratic primary

Candidates

Nominee
Cisco Aguilar, counsel for De Castroverde Law Group and former staffer for Harry Reid

Withdrew
Ellen Spiegel, former member of the Nevada Assembly from the 20th district (2012–2020) (ran for state controller)

Endorsements

Independents and third-party candidates

Candidates

Declared
Ross Crane (Libertarian), sales manager
Janine Hansen (Independent American), executive director of the Independent American Party of Nevada and perennial candidate

General election

Predictions

Endorsements

Polling

Results

Notes

References

External links
Cisco Aguilar (D) for Secretary of State
Jim Marchant (R) for Secretary of State

Secretary of State
Nevada
Nevada Secretary of State elections